Maksim Aleksandrovich Matveyev (born 28 July 1982) is a Russian film and theater actor. He was conferred distinction as Honored Artist of the Russian Federation in 2018.

Early life
Maksim Matveyev was born in Svetly, Kaliningrad Oblast, part of the then Russian SFSR in the Soviet Union.
In 1999 Maksim graduated from high school No. 2    in Saratov with a silver medal. During school years he thought of getting into a medical institute to become a surgeon, but later he changed his mind and decided to enter the Faculty of Law of the Volga Region Academy of Public Service. But an incident led him to the theater department. District ball of the medalists was led by Vladimir Smirnov, a student of Valentina Ermakova. This evening a variety of games and competitions were held and Smirnov noticed Maksim, gave him Valentina's phone number and forcefully urged to try his luck in the theater department. Maksim attempted to pass entrance examinations in two universities at once: the Academy of Civil Service and in the theater department of the Saratov Conservatory. As a result, he was accepted to study at the theater, and immediately for the second term.

His first major role was Nijinsky in the graduation performance "Clown of God."

In 2002, Maksim Matveyev graduated from the theater department of the Saratov State Conservatory. Sobinov (V. Ermakova course). In 2006 - Moscow Art Theater School (course of  Zolotovitsky and   Zemtsov). At the end of the school-studio he was accepted into the troupe of Moscow Art Theatre, where he made his debut in the play "The Piemonte Beast", playing the role of a knight there Joffrey.

He has an extensive list of leading roles on the Moscow Art Theatre stage: "The Drunks" - Laurence; "The Last Sacrifice" - Dulchin;  "The Karamazovs" - Perkhotin, Miusov, Expert, Professor, Pathologist; "An Ideal Husband. A Comedy" - father Artemiy. In the Moscow Theatre managed by Oleg Tabakov: "Wolves and Sheep" - Appolon Murzavetsky; "The Devil" - Yevgeny Ivanovich Irtenev.

Personal life
In 2008 he married Yana Sekste a Latvian and Russian actress (divorced).

In 2010 he married a highly popular Russian actress, Elizaveta Boyarskaya, on April 7, 2012, their son Andrei was born. On December 5, 2018, their son Gregory was born.

Filmography

References

External links

 

1982 births
Living people
People from Svetly
Russian male film actors
Russian male television actors
Russian male stage actors
21st-century Russian male actors
Honored Artists of the Russian Federation
Moscow Art Theatre School alumni
Saratov Conservatory alumni